Humanity most commonly refers to:
 Humankind, the total population of humans
 Humanity (virtue)

Humanity may also refer to:

Literature
 Humanity (journal), an academic journal that focuses on human rights
 Humanity: A Moral History of the Twentieth Century, a 1999 book by Jonathan Glover
 Humanity, a 1990 science fiction novel by Jerry Oltion in the Isaac Asimov's Robots and Aliens series

Music

Albums
 Humanity (The Mad Capsule Markets album) (1990)
 Humanity..., a 2001 album by Shinji Orito
 Humanity: Hour I, a 2007 album by Scorpions
 Humanity World Tour
 Humanity (EP), a 2003 EP by Shy Child
 Humanity (Lincoln Thompson album) (1974)
 Humanity (album series), collection of seven albums by Thomas Bergersen (2020)

Songs
 "Humanity" (ATB song) (2005)
 "Humanity" (Scorpions song) (2007)

Other uses
 Humanity (film), a 1916 American silent film by Broncho Billy Anderson
 Kingdom of Humanity, a micronation in the Spratly Islands from 1914 to 1963
 Religion of Humanity, a secular religion created by Auguste Comte
 Church of Humanity, a church influenced by the Religion of Humanity
 Monument to Humanity, a 2009 statue in Kars, Turkey

See also

 Human (disambiguation)
 Humanitarianism, an ethic of kindness, benevolence, and sympathy
 Humanities, an academic discipline
 Humanity Declaration, a statement made by Japan's Emperor Hirohito at the end of World War II
 Humanity First, an international charitable trust
 Humanity World International, a volunteering and intern organization based in Accra, Ghana
 Humanity+, an international organization advocating for enhanced human capacities 
 Mankind (disambiguation)
 "Oh the humanity", a phrase describing the Hindenburg fire
 Ren (Confucianism)

 Humanity Is A religion